Atherton Bag Lane railway station served an area of Atherton, Greater Manchester in what was then Lancashire, England. It was located on the Bolton and Leigh Railway line which ran from Bolton Great Moor Street to Leigh Station and the Leeds and Liverpool Canal and later to Kenyon Junction.

History
The Bolton and Leigh Railway (B&LR) opened Bag Lane station as one of the original stations on the line on 11 June 1831. The B&LR became part of the Grand Junction Railway in 1845 which became part of the London and North Western Railway (L&NWR) in 1846.

The original "spartan" single platform station was constructed on the East side of the single track line in the centre of Bag Lane village, opposite the Railway Inn.

The station was renamed Atherton in 1847.

The station was rebuilt in 1880 when the line was doubled. The new station having two platforms with canopies. The platforms were accessed by an underground passage from a new road, Railway Street. There was an adjacent goods station capable of handling "Live Stock, Horse Boxes and Prize Cattle Vans". The goods yard was equipped with a 10 ton crane.

The L&NWR became part of the London Midland and Scottish Railway (LMS) during the Grouping in 1923.

The station was renamed Atherton Bag Lane on 2 June 1924 to distinguish it from the Atherton Central on the Lancashire and Yorkshire Railway.

It passed on to the London Midland Region of British Railways on nationalisation in 1948 and was closed by the British Transport Commission six years later.

The line closed to all traffic in the late 1960s and in 1970 the road was re-laid over its original path.

References

Sources

Further reading

External links
 The station on a 1948 OS map via npe maps
 The station via Disused Stations UK
 The station and line via railwaycodes

Disused railway stations in the Metropolitan Borough of Wigan
Former London and North Western Railway stations
Railway stations in Great Britain opened in 1831
Railway stations in Great Britain closed in 1954
Atherton, Greater Manchester